William James Henry Marshall (26 March 1892 – 13 December 1945) was an Australian rules footballer who played three games with Richmond in the Victorian Football League (VFL).

Notes

External links 

1892 births
1945 deaths
Australian rules footballers from Melbourne
Richmond Football Club players
People from North Melbourne